Ladislav Hudec may refer to:

 László Hudec (1893–1958), Hungarian-Slovak architect
 Ladislav Hudec (footballer) (born 1957), Slovak former footballer and current manager